Devi Maya Paneru (born 25 July 1978) is a Nepalese sprinter. She competed in the women's 100 metres at the 2000 Summer Olympics.

References

External links
 

1978 births
Living people
Athletes (track and field) at the 2000 Summer Olympics
Nepalese female sprinters
Olympic athletes of Nepal
Place of birth missing (living people)
Olympic female sprinters
21st-century Nepalese women